The Sikorsky S-17 was a Russian single engine aircraft built at the Russian Baltic Railroad Car Works in Petrograd while Igor Sikorsky was the chief engineer of the aircraft manufacturing division.

Design and development

Specifications

References

S-15
Biplanes
S-15
Single-engined tractor aircraft
Aircraft first flown in 1915